The Harvard Board of Overseers (more formally The Honorable and Reverend the Board of Overseers) is one of Harvard University's two governing boards. Although its function is more consultative and less hands-on than the President and Fellows of Harvard College, the Board of Overseers is sometimes referred to as the "senior" governing board because its formation predates the Fellows' 1650 incorporation.

Overview
Today, there are 30 overseers, all directly elected by alumni; at one point, the board was self-perpetuating. Originally the overseers included, ex officio, the public officials and Puritan clergy of Cambridge and the neighboring towns (hence the "honorable and reverend" of the title). Today, the president and the treasurer of Harvard are ex officio members of the board.

Each year, Harvard alumni elect five new overseers to serve six-year terms. Overseer candidates are nominated by the Harvard Alumni Association (HAA), and those not nominated by the HAA (petition candidates) must gather signatures from Harvard alumni to appear on the ballot.

Ambassador Joseph P. Kennedy Sr. quipped famously of the election of John F. Kennedy, his son, to the board in 1957: "Now I know his religion won't keep him out of the White House. If an Irish Catholic can get elected as an Overseer at Harvard, he can get elected to anything."

Functions
According to the Harvard website, the Board of Overseers complements the work of the President and Fellows of Harvard College:
Drawing on the wide-ranging experience and expertise of its members, the Board exerts broad influence over the University’s strategic directions, provides counsel to the University leadership on priorities and plans, and has the power of consent to certain actions of the Corporation.  The Board’s chief functions include superintendence of the visitation process, the principal mechanism for periodic external review of the quality and direction of the University’s schools, departments, and selected other programs and activities. The Board carries out this responsibility largely through the operation of more than fifty visiting committees, whose work is overseen by and reported to the Board.

Current Overseers 

As of January 2023, the Overseers were:
 Geraldine Acuña-Sunshine (2018–2024), President, Sunshine Care Foundation for Neurological Care and Research, and Senior Counsel, Bracebridge Capital
 Monica Bharel (2022–2026), Public Health and Healthcare Strategist, Former Commissioner of the Massachusetts Department of Public Health
 Raphael Bostic (2020–2026), President and CEO, Federal Reserve Bank of Atlanta
 Mark Carney (2021–2027), United Nations Special Envoy for Climate Action and Finance, Former Governor, Bank of England and Bank of Canada
 Alice Hm Chen (2019–2025), Deputy Secretary for Policy and Planning and Director of Clinical Affairs, California Health and Human Services Agency, and Professor of Medicine, University of California, San Francisco
 Paul L. Choi (2017–2023), Partner, Sidley Austin LLP
 Philip Hart Cullom (2018–2024), Vice Admiral (retired), U.S. Navy
 Sangu J. Delle (2022–2028), Chief Executive Officer, CarePoint
 Darienne Driver (2017–2023), President and CEO, United Way for Southeastern Michigan
 Janet Echelman (2019–2023), Artist, and President of Studio Echelman
 Helena Foulkes (2016–2022), Former Chief Executive Officer, Hudson’s Bay Company
 Carla Harris (2017–2023), Vice Chair of Wealth Management, Senior Client Advisor and Managing Director, Morgan Stanley
 Meredith (Max) Hodges (2018–2024), Executive Director, Boston Ballet
 Marilyn Holifield (2018–2024), Partner, Holland & Knight LLP
 Christopher B. Howard (2021–2027), President, Robert Morris University
 Vivian Hunt (2019–2025), Managing Partner, McKinsey & Company, United Kingdom & Ireland
 Tyler Jacks (2019–2025), Koch Professor of Biology and Director, Koch Institute for Integrative Cancer Research, Massachusetts Institute of Technology
 John King Jr. (2019–2025), President and CEO, The Education Trust
 Raymond Lohier (2021–2027), Judge, U.S. Court of Appeals for the Second Circuit
 Scott Mead (2022–2024), Photographer, and Founder, Bramley Studio
 Lauren Ancel Meyers (2022–2028), Professor, Departments of Integrative Biology, Statistics & Data Sciences, Population Health, The University of Texas at Austin
 Todd Y. Park (2022-2028), Co-Founder and Executive Chairman, Devoted Health
 Margaret (Midge) Purce (2020–2026), Soccer player, United States Women's National Team and Gotham FC
 Alejandro Ramírez Magaña (2016–2022), CEO, Cinépolis
 Yvette Roubideaux (2018–2024), Director, Policy Research Center, National Congress of American Indians
 Reshma Saujani (2019–2025), Founder and CEO, Girls Who Code
 Thea Sebastian (2020–2026), Policy Counsel, Civil Rights Corps
 Megan Red Shirt-Shaw (2021–2027), Director of Native Student Services, University of South Dakota
 Vikas P. Sukhatme (2022–2028), Robert W. Woodruff Professor of Medicine and Dean, Emory School of Medicine Chief Academic Officer, Emory Healthcare
 Leslie P. Tolbert (2017–2023), Regents’ Professor Emerita, Department of Neuroscience, University of Arizona
 Jayson Toweh (2020–2026), Management and Program Analyst, U.S. Environmental Protection Agency
 Wilhelmina “Mimi” Wright (2022–2028), U.S. District Court Judge, District of Minnesota
 Sheryl WuDunn (2021–2027), Journalist and Author; Co-Founder, FullSky Partners
 Lawrence Bacow, President, Harvard University (ex officio)
 Paul Finnegan, Treasurer, Harvard University (ex officio)

Petition candidates 
In the late 1980s, a group calling for a withdrawal of Harvard's investments in apartheid South Africa helped nominate petition candidates for overseer elections. Known as the Harvard-Radcliffe Alumni Against Apartheid (HRAAA), this group supported the first petition candidate to win an overseer's seat. The HRAAA backed South African Archbishop Desmond Tutu in his successful bid to join the board in 1989, and future U.S. president Barack Obama's unsuccessful petition bid in 1991.

In 2020, Harvard Forward, a group calling for increased attention to climate change (including fossil fuel divestment) and representation of younger alumni on the Board, put forward a slate of five petition candidates. Three of the five were elected to the board: environmental scientist Jayson Toweh, civil rights attorney Thea Sebastian, and professional soccer player Margaret Purce. This was despite the efforts of leaders of the Harvard Alumni Association, who circulated a letter calling climate concerns "special interests" and suggesting that it was inappropriate for overseers candidates to state their views on university issues. Following the election of the three Harvard Forward candidates, Harvard changed the election rules in order to make it harder for petition candidates to be elected.

References

External links 
Harvard University Board of Overseers 
Central Administration Governance of the University, from Office of the Provost

Harvard University
Governing bodies of universities and colleges in the United States